In relation to motorsport, Group T5 is a set of technical specifications for prototype cross-country trucks used in off-road Cross-Country Rallying (also called Rally Raid). The group is governed by the Fédération Internationale de l'Automobile (FIA) and defined in appendix J, article 287 of its International Sporting Code.

The FIA launched prototype trucks as Group T4 in 1990, however the Groups T were restructured in 2020 when lightweight vehicles were introduced and the number of car groups were reduced. As part of this Group T4 trucks became Group T5.

Competition 
Group T5 trucks competed in the FIA Cross Country Rally World Cup since its inception in 1993, and since 2022 in the World Rally-Raid Championship.  However T5 trucks are not eligible to compete for the general classification or have a group classification title. The trucks can only compete for local rally raid victories or class victories.

Regulations
Trucks eligible for Group T5 must comply with a fixed set of rules according to Appendix J, article 287. The homologation requirement was removed in 2020, each truck may be based from a series-production run of at least 200 units, or based on a chassis of a set FIA standard. The weight has a minimum of 6760 kg, or 8760 kg for vehicle with engines over 10,000cc. Despite certain modifications, the engine is a stock production engine with a maximum displacement of 13000cc. Because of safety regulations, the cabs have a very strong homologated roll cage. A diagonal bar in the rear of the roll cage is mandatory. More diagonal struts are advised.

Classes
Within the World Rally Raid Championship, T5 classes may include FIA specification trucks or those permitted by the 2021 ASO Dakar Auto regulations which includes sub groups to Group T5:

Group T5.1: Series production truck built according to FIA Group T5 regulations.
Group T5.2: Modified truck conforming to ASO regulations and homologation.
Group T5.3: Support trucks

List of Group T4 (pre-2020) homologated vehicles

See also
Cross-Country Cars
 Group T1 - prototype
 Group T2 - series production
Lightweight Cross-Country Vehicles
 Group T3 - prototype
 Group T4 - series production side-by-side vehicles
Cross-Country Trucks
 Group T5 - prototype and series production

References

External links 
FIA World Rally Raid Championship
FIA Cross Country Rallies Regulations

Fédération Internationale de l'Automobile
Racing car classes
Truck racing series
Rally raids
Dakar Rally
Trucks